The Ingushetia constituency (No.13) is a Russian legislative constituency covering the entirety of Ingushetia.

Members elected

Election results

1993

|-
! colspan=2 style="background-color:#E9E9E9;text-align:left;vertical-align:top;" |Candidate
! style="background-color:#E9E9E9;text-align:left;vertical-align:top;" |Party
! style="background-color:#E9E9E9;text-align:right;" |Votes
! style="background-color:#E9E9E9;text-align:right;" |%
|-
|style="background-color:"|
|align=left|Aleksandra Momdzhyan
|align=left|Independent
|
|31.24%
|-
|style="background-color:"|
|align=left|Murad Bekov
|align=left|Independent
| -
|12.45%
|-
| colspan="5" style="background-color:#E9E9E9;"|
|- style="font-weight:bold"
| colspan="3" style="text-align:left;" | Total
| 
| 100%
|-
| colspan="5" style="background-color:#E9E9E9;"|
|- style="font-weight:bold"
| colspan="4" |Source:
|
|}

1995

|-
! colspan=2 style="background-color:#E9E9E9;text-align:left;vertical-align:top;" |Candidate
! style="background-color:#E9E9E9;text-align:left;vertical-align:top;" |Party
! style="background-color:#E9E9E9;text-align:right;" |Votes
! style="background-color:#E9E9E9;text-align:right;" |%
|-
|style="background-color:"|
|align=left|Mukharbek Aushev
|align=left|Independent
|
|65.24%
|-
|style="background-color:"|
|align=left|Vakha Yevloyev
|align=left|Independent
|
|16.55%
|-
|style="background-color:"|
|align=left|Ismail Merzhoyev
|align=left|Independent
|
|4.56%
|-
|style="background-color:#DA2021"|
|align=left|Aleksandra Ochirova (incumbent)
|align=left|Ivan Rybkin Bloc
|
|3.92%
|-
|style="background-color:#016436"|
|align=left|Khadzhi Murat Ibragimbeyli
|align=left|Nur
|
|1.82%
|-
|style="background-color:"|
|align=left|Mukharbek Khashiyev
|align=left|Independent
|
|1.31%
|-
|style="background-color:"|
|align=left|Magomet Bogatyrev
|align=left|Liberal Democratic Party
|
|1.00%
|-
|style="background-color:"|
|align=left|Aslan Khidirov
|align=left|Independent
|
|0.86%
|-
|style="background-color:#DD137B"|
|align=left|Boris Arsamakov
|align=left|Social Democrats
|
|0.61%
|-
|style="background-color:"|
|align=left|Yury Yeresko
|align=left|Zemsky Sobor
|
|0.43%
|-
|style="background-color:"|
|align=left|Ruslan Aliyev
|align=left|Independent
|
|0.35%
|-
|style="background-color:"|
|align=left|Magomet Ugurchiyev
|align=left|Our Home – Russia
|
|0.34%
|-
|style="background-color:"|
|align=left|Adam Malsagov
|align=left|European Liberal Democratic Party
|
|0.24%
|-
|style="background-color:#0032A0"|
|align=left|Aliskhan Khautiyev
|align=left|Cause of Peter the First
|
|0.16%
|-
|style="background-color:#5A5A58"|
|align=left|Maksharip Yandiyev
|align=left|Federal Democratic Movement
|
|0.11%
|-
|style="background-color:#000000"|
|colspan=2 |against all
|
|0.87%
|-
| colspan="5" style="background-color:#E9E9E9;"|
|- style="font-weight:bold"
| colspan="3" style="text-align:left;" | Total
| 
| 100%
|-
| colspan="5" style="background-color:#E9E9E9;"|
|- style="font-weight:bold"
| colspan="4" |Source:
|
|}

1999

|-
! colspan=2 style="background-color:#E9E9E9;text-align:left;vertical-align:top;" |Candidate
! style="background-color:#E9E9E9;text-align:left;vertical-align:top;" |Party
! style="background-color:#E9E9E9;text-align:right;" |Votes
! style="background-color:#E9E9E9;text-align:right;" |%
|-
|style="background-color:"|
|align=left|Mikhail Gutseriyev
|align=left|Independent
|
|51.31%
|-
|style="background-color:"|
|align=left|Zakre Yevloyev
|align=left|Independent
|
|19.75%
|-
|style="background-color:"|
|align=left|Temur Kodzoyev
|align=left|Independent
|
|18.23%
|-
|style="background-color:"|
|align=left|Musa Ozdoyev
|align=left|Independent
|
|3.44%
|-
|style="background-color:"|
|align=left|Askhab Myakiyev
|align=left|Independent
|
|2.26%
|-
|style="background-color:"|
|align=left|Akhmet Tsurov
|align=left|Independent
|
|1.61%
|-
|style="background-color:#000000"|
|colspan=2 |against all
|
|1.41%
|-
| colspan="5" style="background-color:#E9E9E9;"|
|- style="font-weight:bold"
| colspan="3" style="text-align:left;" | Total
| 
| 100%
|-
| colspan="5" style="background-color:#E9E9E9;"|
|- style="font-weight:bold"
| colspan="4" |Source:
|
|}

2000
The by-election on 2 July 2000 could not be held because the polling stations were not opened after the race frontrunner Alikhan Amirkhanov was disqualified by the Republican Supreme Court the day earlier.

2001

|-
! colspan=2 style="background-color:#E9E9E9;text-align:left;vertical-align:top;" |Candidate
! style="background-color:#E9E9E9;text-align:left;vertical-align:top;" |Party
! style="background-color:#E9E9E9;text-align:right;" |Votes
! style="background-color:#E9E9E9;text-align:right;" |%
|-
|style="background-color:"|
|align=left|Alikhan Amirkhanov
|align=left|Independent
|
|34.56%
|-
|style="background-color:"|
|align=left|Yakub Belkhoroyev
|align=left|Independent
|
|26.13%
|-
|style="background-color:"|
|align=left|Temur Kodzoyev
|align=left|Independent
|
|18.29%
|-
|style="background-color:"|
|align=left|Vakha Yevloyev
|align=left|Independent
|
|9.84%
|-
|style="background-color:"|
|align=left|Musa Ozdoyev
|align=left|Independent
|
|4.14%
|-
|style="background-color:"|
|align=left|Zakre Yevloyev
|align=left|Independent
|
|3.02%
|-
|style="background-color:"|
|align=left|Osman Yevloyev
|align=left|Independent
|
|0.44%
|-
|style="background-color:"|
|align=left|Alikhan Guliyev
|align=left|Independent
|
|0.43%
|-
|style="background-color:#000000"|
|colspan=2 |against all
|
|0.75%
|-
| colspan="5" style="background-color:#E9E9E9;"|
|- style="font-weight:bold"
| colspan="3" style="text-align:left;" | Total
| 
| 100%
|-
| colspan="5" style="background-color:#E9E9E9;"|
|- style="font-weight:bold"
| colspan="4" |Source:
|
|}

2003

|-
! colspan=2 style="background-color:#E9E9E9;text-align:left;vertical-align:top;" |Candidate
! style="background-color:#E9E9E9;text-align:left;vertical-align:top;" |Party
! style="background-color:#E9E9E9;text-align:right;" |Votes
! style="background-color:#E9E9E9;text-align:right;" |%
|-
|style="background-color:"|
|align=left|Bashir Kodzoyev
|align=left|Independent
|
|50.63%
|-
|style="background-color:#FFD700"|
|align=left|Musa Ozdoyev
|align=left|People's Party
|
|12.57%
|-
|style="background-color:"|
|align=left|Alikhan Parov
|align=left|Independent
|
|8.31%
|-
|style="background-color:"|
|align=left|Magomed-Sharip Tsechoyev
|align=left|Rodina
|
|5.60%
|-
|style="background-color:"|
|align=left|Musa Darsigov
|align=left|Independent
|
|2.55%
|-
|style="background-color:"|
|align=left|Idris Abadiyev
|align=left|Independent
|
|2.41%
|-
|style="background:"| 
|align=left|Zaurbek Malsagov
|align=left|Yabloko
|
|2.26%
|-
|style="background:"| 
|align=left|Musa Guliyev
|align=left|Social Democratic Party
|
|1.97%
|-
|style="background-color:#7C73CC"|
|align=left|Magomed Batayev
|align=left|Great Russia–Eurasian Union
|
|1.71%
|-
|style="background-color:"|
|align=left|Khavazh Khashiyev
|align=left|Independent
|
|1.42%
|-
|style="background-color:"|
|align=left|Magomed Gaparkhoyev
|align=left|Independent
|
|0.96%
|-
|style="background-color:"|
|align=left|Khizir Tsechoyev
|align=left|Independent
|
|0.89%
|-
|style="background-color:#000000"|
|colspan=2 |against all
|
|5.07%
|-
| colspan="5" style="background-color:#E9E9E9;"|
|- style="font-weight:bold"
| colspan="3" style="text-align:left;" | Total
| 
| 100%
|-
| colspan="5" style="background-color:#E9E9E9;"|
|- style="font-weight:bold"
| colspan="4" |Source:
|
|}

2016

|-
! colspan=2 style="background-color:#E9E9E9;text-align:left;vertical-align:top;" |Candidate
! style="background-color:#E9E9E9;text-align:leftt;vertical-align:top;" |Party
! style="background-color:#E9E9E9;text-align:right;" |Votes
! style="background-color:#E9E9E9;text-align:right;" |%
|-
|style="background-color:"|
|align=left|Alikhan Kharsiyev
|align=left|United Russia
|
|70.65%
|-
|style="background:"| 
|align=left|Abdulmazhit Martazanov
|align=left|A Just Russia
|
|10.14%
|-
|style="background-color:"|
|align=left|Boris Yevloyev
|align=left|Independent
|
|5.06%
|-
|style="background-color:"|
|align=left|Magamet Dzaurov
|align=left|Rodina
|
|3.86%
|-
|style="background-color:"|
|align=left|Ilyas Bogatyrev
|align=left|Communist Party
|
|2.83%
|-
|style="background-color:"|
|align=left|Kazbek Chemkhilgov
|align=left|The Greens
|
|2.83%
|-
|style="background-color:"|
|align=left|Islam Gadiyev
|align=left|Liberal Democratic Party
|
|2.43%
|-
|style="background:"| 
|align=left|Valery Borshchyov
|align=left|Yabloko
|
|1.55%
|-
|style="background-color: " |
|align=left|Mukhamedali Guseinov
|align=left|Communists of Russia
|
|0.10%
|-
| colspan="5" style="background-color:#E9E9E9;"|
|- style="font-weight:bold"
| colspan="3" style="text-align:left;" | Total
| 
| 100%
|-
| colspan="5" style="background-color:#E9E9E9;"|
|- style="font-weight:bold"
| colspan="4" |Source:
|
|}

2021

|-
! colspan=2 style="background-color:#E9E9E9;text-align:left;vertical-align:top;" |Candidate
! style="background-color:#E9E9E9;text-align:left;vertical-align:top;" |Party
! style="background-color:#E9E9E9;text-align:right;" |Votes
! style="background-color:#E9E9E9;text-align:right;" |%
|-
|style="background-color:"|
|align=left|Muslim Tatriyev
|align=left|United Russia
|
|71.99%
|-
|style="background-color: " |
|align=left|Abulmazhit Martazanov
|align=left|A Just Russia — For Truth
|
|9.99%
|-
|style="background-color:"|
|align=left|Khamzat Kodzoyev
|align=left|Communist Party
|
|6.54%
|-
|style="background-color:"|
|align=left|Islam Gadiyev
|align=left|Liberal Democratic Party
|
|6.37%
|-
|style="background-color:"|
|align=left|Bagaudin Seinaroyev
|align=left|Party of Pensioners
|
|4.26%
|-
| colspan="5" style="background-color:#E9E9E9;"|
|- style="font-weight:bold"
| colspan="3" style="text-align:left;" | Total
| 
| 100%
|-
| colspan="5" style="background-color:#E9E9E9;"|
|- style="font-weight:bold"
| colspan="4" |Source:
|
|}

Notes

References

Russian legislative constituencies
Politics of Ingushetia